Diocese of Acre may refer to either of two Catholic diocesan jurisdictions with seat in the city of Acre, Israel:

Latin Catholic Diocese of Acre
Melkite Greek Catholic Archeparchy of Akka